Jonathan "Jo" Joseph-Augustin (born 13 May 1981 in Tremblay-en-France, Seine-Saint-Denis) is a French footballer who most recently played for FC Edmonton in the North American Soccer League.

Club career
He started his career at Guingamp in Ligue 1, and then to Grenoble and Niort in Ligue 2. In summer 2005, he followed this coach on Niort, Vincent Dufour, to join Beveren of Belgian League on three contract. On 2006-07 season, he became the team captain.

Joseph-Augustin signed with FC Edmonton of the North American Soccer League on 24 February 2012.

International career
He was part of the French squad at 2001 FIFA World Youth Championship.

References

External links

1981 births
Living people
Belgian Pro League players
Chamois Niortais F.C. players
En Avant Guingamp players
Expatriate footballers in Belgium
Expatriate footballers in Germany
Expatriate soccer players in Canada
FC Edmonton players
French footballers
French expatriate footballers
Grenoble Foot 38 players
K.S.K. Beveren players
K.S.V. Roeselare players
Ligue 1 players
Ligue 2 players
People from Tremblay-en-France
Rot-Weiss Essen players
North American Soccer League players
France youth international footballers
AS Moulins players
Association football defenders
Footballers from Seine-Saint-Denis